Susanna Pass  is a 1949 Republic Pictures Trucolor American Western film directed by William Witney and starring Roy Rogers.

Plot

Cast
 Roy Rogers as himself 
 Dale Evans as Kay 'Doc' Parker
 Estelita Rodriguez as Rita
 Martin Garralaga as Carlos
 Robert Emmett Keane as Martin Master, Newspapers editor
 Lucien Littlefield as Russell Masters
 Douglas Fowley as Roberts aka Walter P. Johnson
 David Sharpe as Henchmen Vince
 Robert Bice as Bob Oliver

References

External links
 
 
 
 

1949 films
Republic Pictures films
1949 Western (genre) films
American Western (genre) films
Trucolor films
Films directed by William Witney
1940s English-language films
1940s American films